Mphe-Lebeko is a community council located in the Thaba-Tseka District of Lesotho. Its population in 2006 was 11,463.

Villages
The community of Mphe-Lebeko includes the villages of Aupolasi, Aupolasi (Ntsokoane), Beselateng, Boithatelo, Boloupere, Ha Chooko, Ha Davida, Ha Jimi, Ha Kamoho, Ha Koenyama, Ha Kokolia, Ha Leronti, Ha Letuka, Ha Mahlong, Ha Makeleme, Ha Mokotane, Ha Motšoari, Ha Muso, Ha Nnokoane, Ha Ntake, Ha Ntsokoane, Ha Nyane, Ha Raboshabane, Ha Ramabele, Ha Rankomo, Ha Ratšosane, Ha Sekola, Ha Sekolopata, Ha Sepiriti, Ha Taole, Ha Thabo, Ha Thabure, Ha Toka, Khohlong, Lekhalong, Lekhalong (Ha Khoaele), Letlapeng, Lihloaeleng, Lilomong, Linareng,  Liphokoaneng, Liponchong, Majakaneng, Malebese, Malebese (Mpotjane), Malebese (Ntopo), Malebese (Sututsa), Malihase, Matebeleng, Matlakeng, Matsoapong, Mocheng, Moeaneng, Motse-Mocha, Ntširele, Phuleng, Rothe, Sehaula, Seipalle, Sekoti-se-Chitja, Thabaneng, Tiping and Tlapa-Letsotso.

References

External links
 Google map of community villages

Populated places in Thaba-Tseka District
Thaba-Tseka District